

Max Pfeffer (7 June 1883  – 21 December 1955) was a general in the Wehrmacht of Nazi Germany during World War II who commanded the IV Army Corps. He was a recipient of the Knight's Cross of the Iron Cross.

Pfeffer surrendered to the Soviet forces at the conclusion of the Battle of Stalingrad in 1943. Convicted as a war criminal in the Soviet Union, he died in captivity in 1955.

Awards and decorations

 Knight's Cross of the Iron Cross on  4 December 1941 as Generalleutnant and commander of 297. Infanterie-Division

References

Citations

Bibliography

 

1883 births
1955 deaths
People from Geldern
German Army generals of World War II
Generals of Artillery (Wehrmacht)
German Army personnel of World War I
Recipients of the Knight's Cross of the Iron Cross
German prisoners of war in World War II held by the Soviet Union
German people who died in Soviet detention
German commanders at the Battle of Stalingrad
People from the Rhine Province
Recipients of the clasp to the Iron Cross, 1st class
Military personnel from North Rhine-Westphalia